TappCar is a ridesharing company based in Edmonton, Alberta. The company is the third largest ride-sharing service in Canada, with operations in Edmonton, Grande Prairie and Winnipeg.

History 
TappCar was launched with 200 drivers in Edmonton on March 14, 2016.

In July 2016, TappCar struck a merger deal with St. Albert based cab company Aaron Taxi. The taxi company encouraged all of its 9 drivers to move to the TappCar model. Aaron Taxi's owner, Jean-Pierre Cloutier was named TappCar's new chief operating officer.

in September 2019, the company announced plans to expand into British Columbia, with plans to operate Kelowna and Victoria in addition to the Metro Vancouver.

References

Canada
Road transport in Canada
Online companies of Canada
Transport companies of Canada
Companies based in Edmonton
Transport companies established in 2016